Jeffrey Thoralf Heisholt (born July 28, 1975) is a Canadian keyboardist, vocalist, composer, broadcaster, and producer. In 1996 he formed Burt Neilson Band, with whom he co-wrote and released four records.  The band toured Canada twenty times, played more than 1000 shows and became a staple of the Canadian jamband community. Since 2004, he has played across the country with soul-rocker Peter Elkas and contributed to Elkas's second album, the Charlie Sexton produced Wall of Fire. In early 2008, Heisholt joined the touring line-up of Canadian rock band The Trews and has been a part of their live and studio configuration since then.

In 2012, Jeff joined Toronto trio Little Foot Long Foot, writing and producing their 2013 single "Bridge Concerns".   In 2013, Jeff also joined the touring lineup of Canadian roots-rock veterans, Skydiggers. Jeff played keys and recorded with Hamilton's Terra Lightfoot from 2015 to 2017.

Heisholt formed Current Fantasy in early 2019, a solo, largely improvised electronic project.  He also has hosted a radio show of the same name since early 2020, airing weekly on multiple university radio stations across Canada.

Jeff's mother, Donna Heisholt, is a well known Thunder Bay-based visual artist.

Discography 
Julian
1994: Julian ep
1998: Pinstripe Pop

Burt Neilson Band
1998: Burt Neilson Band
2000: Orange Shag Carpet
2001: Five Alive
2004: By the Door

Carrie Catherine
2008: Green Eyed Soul

Steven Elmo Murphy
2004: Friends and I
2006: Open For Business
2012: Demon Nights

Peter Elkas
2007: Wall of Fire
2011: Repeat Offender
2018: Lion

Sean MacDonald & The Astronauts
2008: Pink Noise – (track – Please take me off your list)

Trevor Howard
2007: The Healing Sessions

The Ragged Bankers
2012: The Ragged Bankers

The Trews
2009: The Trews Acoustic – Friends and Total Strangers CD
2009: The Trews Acoustic – Friends and Total Strangers DVD
2010: Highway of Heroes (single)
2011: Hope & Ruin
2012: Thank You and I'm Sorry
2014: The Trews
2016: Time Capsule
2020: 1921 (Single)
2021: Wanderer

Mark Crissinger
2009: Fear No Journey
2011: Raw Umber
2013: Terra Nova
2015: Blues Expression
2016: Night Light

w/ John-Angus MacDonald
2010: Song For Africa – Rwanda: Rises Up – Yearning

Garth Hudson w/ The Trews
2010: Garth Hudson Presents a Canadian Celebration of The Band! – Move to Japan

Dearly Beloved
2012: Hawk vs Pigeon – (World Series of Fedoras & Lizard Fight)

Karyn Ellis
2013: More Than a Hero

Skydiggers
2013: No.1 Northern
2017: Warmth of the Sun
2020: Lovin You Ain't Easy (Single)

Poor Young Things
2013: The Heart. The Head. The End.

Molly Thomason
2014: Columbus Field

Meredith Shaw
2014: Hardest Goodbye

Jerry Leger
2014: Early Riser

The Meds
2014: South America

The Honeyrunners
2014: EP 2

The Kerouacs
2014: The Kerouacs

The Once
2014: Departures

Little Foot Long Foot
2014: Woman

Tim Chaisson
2015: Lost In Light

Rufus Wainright
2015: Je reviendrai à Montréal - Single
2015: Forever and a Year - from the HOLDING THE MAN Soundtrack

Terra Lightfoot
2017: Live in Concert
2017: New Mistakes

Eli and The Straw Man
2017: Light the World

Whitehorse
2018: A Whitehorse Winter Classic

The Proud Sons
2018: The Proud Sons
2019: Raising Hell (single)

Sarah Jane Scouten
2019: Confessions

Current Fantasy
2020: Currently Fantastic Vol.1
2020: Beforetimes/Aftertimes (single)
2021: Rio (single)

Joan Smith & The Jane Does
2020: Where Did You Sleep Last Night (In The Pines) (Single)

Jeen
2020: Jeen
2021: Dog Bite

Samantha Martin & Delta Sugar
2020: The Reckless One

As producer
Poor Young Things
2011: Get Thorny 3 – Easy

Little Foot Long Foot
2013: Bridge Concerns – Single

Mark Crissinger
2013: Terra Nova

References

External links 
 Jeff Heisholt on Myspace
 Peter Elkas.com
 Burt Neilson Band on Myspace
 The Trews Online

1975 births
Canadian indie rock musicians
Canadian rock singers
Canadian male singer-songwriters
Canadian singer-songwriters
Living people
Musicians from Thunder Bay
21st-century Canadian male singers